Portinho is a village on Príncipe Island in the nation of São Tomé and Príncipe located 2 km east of the island capital Santo António. Its population is 3 (2012 census).

References

Populated places in the Autonomous Region of Príncipe